Joshua Beam House is a historic home located near Shelby, Cleveland County, North Carolina.  It was built about 1845, and is a two-story, gable-roofed frame dwelling in the Greek Revival style. It has a one-story rear kitchen ell. The front facade features a two-story pedimented porch with an intervening second floor balcony.

It was listed on the National Register of Historic Places in 1980.

References

Houses on the National Register of Historic Places in North Carolina
Greek Revival houses in North Carolina
Houses completed in 1845
Houses in Cleveland County, North Carolina
National Register of Historic Places in Cleveland County, North Carolina
Plantation houses in North Carolina